Funing may refer to the following locations in China:

Ningde, Fujian, formerly named Funing
Funing County, Hebei (抚宁县)
Funing County, Jiangsu (阜宁县)
Funing County, Yunnan (富宁县)
Funing, Heilongjiang (阜宁镇), town in Suifenhe
Funing, Hebei (抚宁镇), town in and seat of Funing County, Hebei